The 1912 New York Highlanders season was the team's tenth. It was the final season for the "Highlanders" nickname, before officially adopting the already more common "Yankees" name. It was also their final season playing their home games at Hilltop Park. The team finished with a total of 50 wins and 102 losses, coming in 8th, last place in the American League. The club was managed by Harry Wolverton.  The New York franchise would not finish in last place again until the 1966 season. To date, this remains the second and last 100-loss season in Yankees history, the other being a few years prior in 1908.

Regular season

Logo and uniforms 
For 1912, the curving "NY" migrated from the sleeve to its now-familiar spot on the left breast of the jersey (on some versions of the uniform, though not the one shown here). This was also the year that pinstripes were introduced.

Team nickname 
By this season, the alternate nickname "Yankees" was in very common usage by the media. The New York Times for Opening Day 1912 reported that "The Yankees presented a natty appearance in their new uniforms of white with black pinstripes." The pinstripes were a one-year experiment, but they would return for good on the home uniforms in 1915.

The final game of the season, and the final game for the "Highlanders" at the Hilltop, was played on October 5, 1912. The team moved to the Polo Grounds the following year. Hilltop Park was closed after the 1912 season and was demolished in 1914. It is now occupied by the New York-Presbyterian Hospital.

Season standings

Record vs. opponents

Notable transactions 
 July 21, 1912: Del Paddock was purchased by the Highlanders from the Dubuque Hustlers.

Roster

Player stats

Batting

Starters by position 
Note: Pos = Position; G = Games played; AB = At bats; H = Hits; Avg. = Batting average; HR = Home runs; RBI = Runs batted in

Other batters 
Note: G = Games played; AB = At bats; H = Hits; Avg. = Batting average; HR = Home runs; RBI = Runs batted in

Pitching

Starting pitchers 
Note: G = Games pitched; IP = Innings pitched; W = Wins; L = Losses; ERA = Earned run average; SO = Strikeouts

Other pitchers 
Note: G = Games pitched; IP = Innings pitched; W = Wins; L = Losses; ERA = Earned run average; SO = Strikeouts

Relief pitchers 
Note: G = Games pitched; W = Wins; L = Losses; SV = Saves; ERA = Earned run average; SO = Strikeouts

References

External links

1912 New York Highlanders team page at www.baseball-almanac.com
1912 New York Highlanders at Baseball Reference

New York Yankees seasons
New York Highlanders
New York Highlanders
1910s in Manhattan
Washington Heights, Manhattan